The American Samoa , recognized  by the International Olympic Committee (IOC), represented by the National Olympic Committee of American Samoa (ASANOC), competed at the Games of the III Youth Olympiad in Buenos Aires, Argentina, from October 6 to 18, 2018.

Athletics

Beach handball

The  girls' team qualified based on his performance (best oceania team) at the 2017 Youth Beach Handball World Championship in Mauritius.

 Frances Nautu
 Stephanie Floor
 Danielle Floor
 Roselyn Faleao
 Naomi A'asa
 Philomena Tofaeono
 Jasmine Liu
 Imeleta Mata'utia

 Coach: Carl Sagapolutele Floor
 Assistant coach (Defense): Joey Sagapolu

Boxing

Wrestling

Key:
  – Victory by Fall
  – Without any point scored by the opponent
  – With point(s) scored by the opponent

References

2018 in American Samoan sports
Nations at the 2018 Summer Youth Olympics
American Samoa at the Youth Olympics